Ambrózfalva is a village in Csongrád County, in the Southern Great Plain region of southern Hungary.

Geography

Population

Demographic
Ambrózfalva's population declared themselves as 86% Hungarian nationality, 13% Slovak nationality, and 1% Romanian nationality in a 2001 census.

Coat of arms
The coat of arms of Ambrózfalva has two images: three ears of corn on the left side, and a patriarchal cross on the right. The three ears of corn act as a reference to the agricultural characteristics of the village and the area. The golden ears of corn symbolize the ancestors' settling in and also represents their success. The patriarchal cross is similar to that of the coat of arms of Slovakia and is a reminder of the Slovak origin of the population of the area. It also represents the importance of recognizing national and ethnic traditions.

References

Populated places in Csongrád-Csanád County